Sankhari is a village in Balasore district in the Indian State of Odisha.

References 

Villages in Balasore district